Heinrich Frauenlob (between 1250 and 1260 – 29 November 1318), sometimes known as Henry of Meissen (Heinrich von Meißen), was a Middle High German poet, a representative of both the Sangspruchdichtung and Minnesang genres.
He was one of the most celebrated poets of the late medieval period, venerated and imitated well into the 15th century.

Biography
Frauenlob was born in the town of Meissen in Saxony. He had great musical talents and probably held a court position in Prague at the beginning of his career. After several years wandering as a minstrel in the service of various patrons, he is said to have established the first school of the meistersingers at Mainz, although no documentary evidence confirms that early tradition.

The stage name Frauenlob (Middle High German Vrowenlop), meaning "praise of ladies", is said to have been given to him as the result of a poetic contest with the poet-minstrel Regenbogen, in which he maintained that the term frau "lady, high-born woman" was superior to the term weib "woman, adult female". But it has been shown that he already had the nickname when quite young, before the contest could have taken place.

The women of Mainz are said to have carried his bier to the cathedral in appreciation of his lifelong, chivalrous devotion to their sex. His tomb was restored in 1783 by women during the "Werther" period of German literature, and the women of Mainz erected a monument to his memory near his tomb in 1842. In 1892 German composer Reinhold Becker (1842–1924) wrote an opera about an episode in the poet's life.

Works
Frauenlob was one of the most influential German poets of the 14th century, his contemporary reception being equalled only by Walther von der Vogelweide.
His works are extant in numerous manuscripts, and his style was widely imitated still in the 15th century, so that it is in many cases impossible to decide on the authenticity of a given work. His minnelied Alle Freude verlässt mich was adapted in Czech by Záviš von Zap in c. 1400. 

Counted among his works are thirteen minnelieder and three long strophic poems: the Frauenleich (also known as the Marienleich), the Minneleich (Lay of Love), and the Kreuzleich (Lay of the Cross). His best-known work, the Marienleich, is a poem about the Celestial Woman of the Apocalypse, who is conflated with the Virgin Mary, divine Wisdom, and the beloved woman of the Song of Songs. Frauenlob also composed a dispute between Minne and the World and a large number of Sangsprüche (estimates ranging at around 300 poems in 15 known melodies).
Frauenlob is among the last major representatives of late medieval Spruchdichtung. Tervooren (2001) sees the very popularity of Frauenlob as the culmination and end-point of the genre, after which it ceased to innovate, easing into imitation and written tradition.<ref>Helmut Tervooren, Sangspruchdichtung', Metzler, Stuttgart 2001.</ref>
An edition of his poems  was published by Ettmüller in 1843, superseded by the 2-volume Göttingen edition by Karl Stackmann (Leichs, Sangsprüche, Lieder) in 1981.

The Frauenleich with its surviving music was performed by the ensemble Sequentia in 1990. A CD of that performance is available with the English translation and a thorough, learned introduction by Barbara Newman, published in 2006.

Notes

References

Further reading
Michael Baldzuhn: Vom Sangspruch zum Meisterlied. Untersuchungen zu einem literarischen Traditionszusammenhang auf der Grundlage der Kolmarer Liederhandschrift. Niemeyer, Tübingen 2002, .
Thomas Bein: Sus hup sich ganzer liebe vrevel. Studien zu Frauenlobs Minneleich (= Europäische Hochschulschriften, Reihe 1: Deutsche Sprache und Literatur; Band 1062). Lang, Frankfurt am Main et al. 1988, .
Harald Bühler: Frauenlob-Index. Mit einem Vorwort von Karl Bertau. Palm & Enke, Erlangen 1985.
Sebastian Cöllen: Gefiolierte blüte kunst. Eine kognitionslinguistisch orientierte Untersuchung zur Metaphorik in Frauenlobs Marienleich. Uppsala Universität, Uppsala 2018,  (diss.). (URN: http://urn.kb.se/resolve?urn=urn:nbn:se:uu:diva-347182)
Josephine Graf-Lomtano: "Der Minnesänger Heinrich Frauenlob". In: Reclams Universum 35.1 (1919), pp. 112–114.
Patricia Harant: Poeta Faber. Der Handwerks-Dichter bei Frauenlob. Texte, Übersetzungen, Textkritik, Kommentar und Metapherninterpretationen (= Erlanger Studien; vol. 110). Palm & Enke, Erlangen/Jena 1997.
Jens Haustein (ed.), Karl Stackmann: Frauenlob, Heinrich von Mügeln und ihre Nachfolger. Wallstein, Göttingen 2002, .
Jens Haustein, Ralf-Henning Steinmetz: Studien zu Frauenlob und Heinrich von Mügeln. Festschrift für Karl Stackmann zum 80. Geburtstag (= Scrinium Friburgense; vol. 15). Universitätsverlag, Freiburg/Schweiz 2002, .
Christoph Huber: Wort sint der dinge zeichen. Untersuchungen zum Sprachdenken der mittelhochdeutschen Spruchdichtung bis Frauenlob. Artemis, München 1977.
Susanne Köbele: Frauenlobs Lieder. Parameter einer literarhistorischen Standortbestimmung (= Bibliotheca Germanica; vol. 43), Francke, Tübingen/Basel 2003.
Claudia Lauer, Uta Störmer-Caysa (ed.): Handbuch Frauenlob. Universitätsverlag Winter, Heidelberg 2018, .
Cord Meyer: Der „helt von der hoye Gerhart" und der Dichter Frauenlob. Höfische Kultur im Umkreis der Grafen von Hoya. Bibliotheks- und Informationssystem der Universität Oldenburg, Oldenburg 2002,  (URN: urn:nbn:de:gbv:715-oops-6052).
Anton Neugebauer: „Es lebt des Sängers Bild" – Frauenlob in der Kunst. Bilder Heinrichs von Meissen vom 14. bis zum 20. Jahrhundert (= Forschungsbeiträge des Bischöflichen Dom- und Diözesanmuseums; vol. 4). Schnell & Steiner, Regensburg 2018, .
Anton Neugebauer: "Frauenlob und sein Grab: 700. Todestag des Mainzer Dichters Heinrich von Meißen. Frauenlob-Wochen im Dommuseum". In: Mainz. Vierteljahreshefte für Kultur, Politik, Wirtschaft, Geschichte; vol. 38(3) (2018), ISSN 0720-5945, pp. 22–27.
Brunhilde Peter: Die theologisch-philosophische Gedankenwelt des Heinrich Frauenlob. Speyer 1957, DNB 453741312 (diss.).
Oskar Saechtig: Über die Bilder und Vergleiche in den Sprüchen und Liedern Heinrichs von Meißen. Marburg 1930, DNB 571137075 (diss.).
Werner Schröder (ed.): Cambridger „Frauenlob"-Kolloquium 1986 (= Wolfram-Studien; vol. 10). Schmidt, Berlin 1988.
Guenther Schweikle: Minnesang (= Sammlung Metzler; vol. 244). Second edition. Metzler, Stuttgart/Weimar 1995.
Michael Shields: "Frauenlob [Heinrich von Meissen]". The New Grove Dictionary of Music and Musicians. Second edition, edited by Stanley Sadie and John Tyrrell. Macmillan Publishers, London 2001.
Ralf-Henning Steinmetz: Liebe als universales Prinzip bei Frauenlob. Ein volkssprachlicher Weltentwurf in der europäischen Dichtung um 1300. Niemeyer, Tübingen 1994.
Helmuth Thomas: Untersuchungen zur Überlieferung der Spruchdichtung Frauenlobs (= Palaestra; vol. 217) Akademische Verlagsgesellschaft, Leipzig 1939, DNB 362884714.
Burghart Wachinger: Sängerkrieg. Untersuchungen zur Spruchdichtung des 13. Jahrhunderts. Beck, München 1973.
Shao-Ji Yao: Der Exempelgebrauch in der Sangspruchdichtung. Vom späten 12. Jahrhundert bis zum Anfang des 14. Jahrhunderts''. Königshausen & Neumann, Würzburg 2006, .

External links
 
 

13th-century births
1318 deaths
Burials at Mainz Cathedral
Minnesingers
People from Meissen
13th-century German poets
14th-century German poets
German male poets